My Dad Baryshnikov is a 2011 Russian comedy-drama film directed by Dmitry Povolotsky.

Plot 
The film takes place in Moscow during the time of Perestroika. The film tells about the boy Borya, who is studying choreography. His dream is a dance with the most beautiful girls in the class. And suddenly he learns that his father is the great dancer Mikhail Baryshnikov.

Cast 
 Anna Mikhalkova as Larisa
 Dmitry Vyskubenko as Borya Fishkin
 Ksenia Surkova as Katya
 Tina Barkalaya as queen of Spain
 Pyotr Raikov as Aleksei
 Sergey Sosnovsky as Semyon Petrovych
 Egor Dolgopolov as Sanya
 Vladimir Kapustin as Mikhail Fishkin
 Anatoliy Kott as Igor Vasilievich
 Mark Ganeev as Vovan
 Maria Politseymako as Borya's grandmother

References

External links 
 

2011 films
2010s Russian-language films
Russian comedy-drama films
2011 comedy-drama films
Films about ballet